Frank Atwell Cross (January 20, 1873 – November 2, 1932) was an American Major League baseball player in 1901. Nicknamed "Mickey", he played for the Cleveland Blues for one game on May 20. His brothers, Joe Cross,  Amos and Lave, also played in the Major Leagues. A week after his lone major league appearance, he requested his release and rejoined the minor league Dayton Old Soldiers, where he had an opportunity to play every day.

References

External links

1873 births
1932 deaths
Cleveland Blues (1901) players
Major League Baseball outfielders
Baseball players from Cleveland
19th-century baseball players
Minor league baseball managers
Atlanta Crackers players
Syracuse Stars (minor league baseball) players
Cleveland Lake Shores players
Dayton Old Soldiers players
Milwaukee Brewers (minor league) players
Evansville River Rats players
Dayton Veterans players
South Bend Greens players
Terre Haute Hottentots players
Fond du Lac Webfoots players